Balıkesir is an electoral district of the Grand National Assembly of Turkey. It elects eight members of parliament (deputies) to represent the province of the same name for a four-year term by the D'Hondt method, a party-list proportional representation system.

Members 
Population reviews of each electoral district are conducted before each general election, which can lead to certain districts being granted a smaller or greater number of parliamentary seats. Balıkesir elected 9 MPs in 1999. The district has lost one seat since then and has elected 8 MPs since 2002.

General elections

2011

June 2015

November 2015

2018

Presidential elections

2014

References 

Electoral districts of Turkey
Politics of Balıkesir Province